Fishermen's Bend Aerodrome is a former aerodrome located at Fishermen's Bend, Melbourne, Victoria, Australia. The aerodrome served the Australian Governments Government Aircraft Factories and the Commonwealth Aircraft Corporation plants. Due to the newer jet aircraft proposed to be built requiring longer runways for safe operations, the Fishermans Bend runways were not able to be extended as the aerodrome had been encroached upon by development. Avalon Airport was opened in 1953, to cater for the production of jet military aircraft.

Motorsport 
The airfield was used for motorcycle races in August 1948 then cars from 1949. It hosted events counting towards the Australian Drivers' Championship in both 1958 and 1959. and races were held at the circuit until at least 1960.    

Subsequently the airstrip was used for organised drag racing until at least 1967 (possibly later) at which time AA class fuellers raced along with funny cars in times approaching 10 secs for the 1/4 mile track.

Notes

References
Dennis, Peter; Grey, Jeffrey; Morris, Ewan; and Robin Prior (1995). The Oxford Companion to Australian Military History. Melbourne: Oxford University Press. .

Defunct airports in Victoria (Australia)